Phatanus was a city and episcopal see in Roman Egypt, which remains a Latin Church titular see. The titular see has also been held by one Coptic Catholic auxiliary eparch.

History 
The city, near modern El-Batanu or El-Batnu, was important enough in the Late Roman province of Aegyptus Primus to become one of the suffragans of the Metropolitan of the capital, none other than the original Patriarchate of Alexandria. Later it faded.

Titular see 
The diocese was nominally restored Latin Church titular see of the episcopal (lowest) rank under the name of Phatanus (Latine), Phatanen(sis) (Latin adjective) or Fatano (Curiate Italian).

It is vacant since decades, having had only two incumbents, so far of the fitting episcopal rank, including one Eastern Catholic :
 Jean Wolff, Holy Ghost Fathers (C.S.Sp.) (1941.07.08 – 1955.09.14), first as Apostolic Vicar of Majunga (Madagascar) (1941.07.08 – 1947.02.13), then as Vicar Apostolic of Diégo-Suarez (Madagascar) (1947.02.13 – 1955.09.14); later succeeded as last suffragan Bishop of Diégo-Suarez (Madagascar) (1955.09.14 – 1958.12.11), promoted with his see first Metropolitan Archbishop of Diégo-Suarez (1958.12.11 – 1967.04.13), emeritate as Titular Archbishop of Gummi in Byzacena (1967.04.13 – 1971.05.24)
 Youhanna Nueir, Friars Minor (O.F.M.) (1955.12.08 – 1965.03.26) as Auxiliary Bishop of Luqsor of the Copts (Egypt) (1955.12.08 – 1965.03.26), Eparch (Bishop) of Assiut of the Copts (once Lycopolis, Egypt) (1965.03.26 – retired 1990.03.20)

Sources and external links 
 GCatholic

Catholic titular sees in Africa
Former Roman Catholic dioceses in Africa